Tillaux may refer to:

Paul Jules Tillaux (1834–1904), French surgeon
Tillaux-Chaput avulsion fracture
Tillaux's triad